is a story-driven, Flash-based online collectible card game produced by Japanese studio Dex Entertainment and published by Media Blasters. It was released in Japan in 2004, and released in English in 2008. Alteil claims to be the most popular online card game in its home country). The images on the online cards were designed by a team of Japanese fantasy artists, and the playing style is different from many other traditional card games. The game is no longer managed by Dex Entertainment, but is currently managed by GP Core Edge (a subsidiary of Gamepot).  Recently, this game has been re-released to North America by the company Apocoplay as of October 6, 2012.

Only Mirage Master is currently available in the English version.

Gameplay 
A game of Alteil usually lasts between fifteen and twenty minutes. Since the internet allows players to use virtual gameplay techniques, players are able to do things which they couldn't do using physical cards. For instance, players can have the same card from their deck in multiple files (files are groupings of cards that are used in a match), choose cards to use from the entire deck rather than drawing cards from the deck and using them a hand, and complex mathematics can be implemented without disrupting the pace of the game.

Cards 
The cards are separated into four element like groups called Spheres of Influence. Cards of a sphere typically have similar strengths and weaknesses.

Reception
Inventor Spot states: "Alteil takes up where these games leave off, adding exquisite anime style artwork and an online dimension few RPGs can match!" 

Nate Ming at Crunchyroll praised the "smartly-designed system and beautiful card art."

References

External links 
 English version on Steam as Alteil: Horizons
 Japanese version's official site
Player Ratings of Alteil on TCGPlayer.com
Review of Alteil on TCGPlayer.com
 Anime News Network Article
 

2004 video games
Card games introduced in 2004
Flash games
Multiplayer online games
Digital collectible card games
Media Blasters
Video games developed in Japan
Gamepot games